The following is a list of notable deaths in August 2020.

Entries for each day are listed alphabetically by surname. A typical entry lists information in the following sequence:
 Name, age, country of citizenship at birth, subsequent country of citizenship (if applicable), reason for notability, cause of death (if known), and reference.

August 2020

1
José Vicente Anaya, 73, Mexican writer, poet and cultural journalist.
Pablo Aranda, 52, Spanish writer, stomach cancer.
Eduardo Arias, 64, Panamanian whistleblower, cancer.
Frank Barnaby, 92, British nuclear physicist.
Wendy Blunsden, 77, Australian cricketer (national team).
Resurreccion Borra, 84, Filipino civil servant, Commissioner (2001–2008) and Chairman (2007–2008) of the Commission on Elections.
Leonardo Bragaglia, 87, Italian theater actor, director and writer.
Wilford Brimley, 85, American actor (The Natural, The Thing, Cocoon) and singer, kidney disease.
Emil Ciocoiu, 71, Romanian painter and photographer.
David Darcy, 76, Australian football player (Western Bulldogs, South Adelaide) and coach.
Julio Diamante, 89, Spanish film director (The Art of Living, Sex o no sex) and screenwriter.
Rickey Dixon, 53, American football player (Cincinnati Bengals, Los Angeles Raiders, Oklahoma Sooners), Jim Thorpe Award winner (1987), amyotrophic lateral sclerosis.
Alex Dupont, 66, French football player and manager (Dunkerque, Sedan, Ajaccio).
Feri Horvat, 78, Slovenian politician, Speaker of the National Assembly (2004).
Sally Jacobs, 87, British stage designer.
Alexandre Keresztessy, 81, Hungarian-born Belgian TV producer (RTBF).
Vitold Kreyer, 87, Russian triple jumper, Olympic bronze medallist (1956, 1960).
Lawrence Laurent, 95, American television critic (The Washington Post).
Kartika Liotard, 49, Dutch politician, MEP (2004–2014).
Armand Mauss, 92, American sociologist.
Geoffrey P. Megargee, 60, American historian.
Stan Mellor, 83, British National Hunt jockey and horse trainer, Champion Jockey (1960–1962).
Pydikondala Manikyala Rao, 58, Indian politician, Andhra Pradesh MLA (2014–2019), COVID-19.
Tony Morris, 57, British newsreader (ITV Granada), kidney cancer.
Abdul Hay Mosallam Zarara, 87, Palestinian artist.
John Otto, 71, American politician, pancreatic cancer.
Rodney H. Pardey, 75, American poker player, complications from a stroke.
Tom Pollock, 77, American studio executive (Universal Pictures, The Montecito Picture Company) and film producer (Hitchcock), heart attack.
Rosemary Radley-Smith, 81, British paediatric cardiologist, cancer.
Harley Redin, 100, American basketball coach.
Reni Santoni, 82, American actor (Dirty Harry, Enter Laughing, 28 Days).
Harold Scheraga, 98, American biophysicist.
M. S. Sellasamy, 93, Sri Lankan unionist and politician.
Khosrow Sinai, 79, Iranian film director (In the Alleys of Love), COVID-19.
Amar Singh, 64, Indian politician, MP (since 1996), kidney failure.
Stan Statham, 81, American politician, member of the California State Assembly (1976–1994), heart attack.
Ross Warner, 76, Australian rugby league player (North Sydney Bears, New South Wales).
Douglas Wiseman, 90, Canadian politician, Ontario MPP (1971–1990).

2
Saïd Amara, 87, Algerian football player (Béziers, Bordeaux, national team) and manager.
Samia Amin, 75, Egyptian actress.
Gregory Areshian, 71, Armenian archaeologist, COVID-19.
Antony F. Campbell, 85, New Zealand-born Australian Old Testament scholar.
Jerry Chipman, 79, American actor (21 Grams) and non-profit executive, spokesperson for St. Jude Children's Research Hospital, complications from heart surgery.
Alan Cowley, 86, British-born American chemist.
Umesh Dastane, 63, Indian cricketer (Railways).
Marie-Hélène Descamps, 82, French politician, MEP (2002–2009).
Bruno Dettori, 78, Italian politician, Senator (2001–2006).
Leon Fleisher, 92, American pianist, cancer.
Syed Iftikhar Ul Hassan, 78, Pakistani politician, MP (since 2013).
V. Krishnasamy, 72, Malaysian footballer (Penang, Perak, national team).
Douglas Latchford, 89, British art and antiques dealer.
Jean-Louis Leonetti, 82, French football player (Marseille, Rouen, Angoulême) and manager.
Larry Novak, 87, American jazz pianist.
Mark Ormrod, 62, English historian, bowel cancer.
Suzanne Perlman, 97, Hungarian-Dutch painter.
Keith Pontin, 64, Welsh footballer (Cardiff City, Barry Town, national team).
Bobby Prescott, 89, Panamanian baseball player (Kansas City Athletics).
Leslie Randall, 95, English actor (Billy Liar, Emmerdale, Goal!). (death announced on this date)
Rip Van Winkle, 14, Irish racehorse and sire.
Tootie Robbins, 62, American football player (Arizona Cardinals, Green Bay Packers), COVID-19.
Yael Renan, 72–73, Israeli writer and translator.
Bob Ryland, 100, American tennis player.
Anant Shet, 59, Indian politician, Goa MLA (2007–2017).
Satyanarayan Singh, 77, Indian politician, Bihar MLA (1990–2000), COVID-19.
Albert Somit, 100, American political scientist.
John Tilbury, 89, British Olympic rower.
Carol A. Timmons, 62, American military general, Adjutant General of the Delaware National Guard (2017–2019).
Dick Trachok, 94, American college football coach and athletic director (Nevada Wolf Pack).
Zhaksylyk Ushkempirov, 69, Kazakh wrestler, Olympic champion (1980).
Kamal Rani Varun, 62, Indian politician, MP (1996–1999) and Uttar Pradesh MLA (since 2017), COVID-19.
Wang Hai, 94, Chinese fighter pilot, Commander of the PLA Air Force (1985–1992).

3
ATM Alamgir, 70, Bangladeshi politician, MP (1991–1996), COVID-19.
Goldie Alexander, 83, Australian author.
Dani Anwar, 52, Indonesian politician, Senator (2009–2014), COVID-19.
Homayoun Reza Atardi, 50, Iranian musician, composer and producer, COVID-19.
Ralph Barbieri, 74, American sports radio host (KNBR), Parkinson's disease.
Mohammad Barkatullah, 76, Bangladeshi television personality, director and producer, COVID-19.
Carmine Benincasa, 72, Italian art historian.
M'hamed Benredouane, 69, Algerian politician.
David Bishop, 91, American politician, member of the Minnesota House of Representatives (1983–2002).
Ernesto Brambilla, 86, Italian Grand Prix motorcycle road racer and racing driver.
Lorenzo Chiarinelli, 85, Italian Roman Catholic prelate, Bishop of Sora-Cassino-Aquino-Pontecorvo (1983–1993), Aversa (1993–1997) and Viterbo (1997–2010).
Roger De Pauw, 99, Belgian Olympic cyclist (1948).
Philippe Frémeaux, 70, French journalist.
Billy Goldenberg, 84, American composer (Kojak, Rhoda, Play It Again, Sam) and songwriter.
Shirley Ann Grau, 91, American writer (The Keepers of the House), Pulitzer winner (1965), complications from a stroke.
Pien-Chien Huang, 89, Chinese-American molecular biologist.
John Hume, 83, Irish politician, MP (1983–2005), MEP (1979–2004) and Foyle MLA (1998–2000), Nobel laureate (1998).
Ralph Klassen, 64, Canadian ice hockey player (St. Louis Blues), cancer.
Celina Kofman, 95–96, Argentine political activist.
Hana Krampolová, 59, Czech actress.
Jürgen Kühl, 85, German Olympic sprinter (1956).
Luo Pei-ying, 59, Taiwanese actress. (body discovered on this date)
Pascal Martin, 67–68, French journalist.
Sean Martin, 69, American-born Canadian cartoonist (Doc and Raider), pancreatic cancer.
Ralf Metzenmacher, 56, German painter.
Mohammad Reza Navaei, 71, Iranian Olympic wrestler (1976).
Eduardo Márquez, 76, Peruvian footballer (FBC Melgar).
John Okell, 86, British linguist.
Ernie Phythian, 78, English footballer (Wrexham, Hartlepool United, Bolton Wanderers).
Ivan A. Schulman, 88–89, American literary critic.
Michael Peter Smith, 78, American songwriter ("The Dutchman"), colon cancer.
Adhe Tapontsang, 88, Tibetan dissident and political prisoner.
Isabelle Weingarten, 70, French actress (Four Nights of a Dreamer, The State of Things, The Satin Slipper) and photographer.

4
Ebrahim Alkazi, 94, Indian theatre director, heart attack.
Frances Allen, 88, American computer scientist.
Manabendra Bandyopadhyay, 82, Indian author and translator.
Doris Buffett, 92, American philanthropist and writer.
Brent Carver, 68, Canadian actor (Kiss of the Spider Woman, Parade, The Event), Tony winner (1993).
Murray Cheater, 73, New Zealand Olympic hammer thrower (1976).
Daisy Coleman, 23, American documentary subject (Audrie & Daisy) and sexual assault survivor, suicide.
Tony Costanza, 52, American metal drummer (Machine Head, Crowbar).
Joseph Thlama Dawha, 66, Nigerian chemical engineer, managing director of the Nigerian National Petroleum Corporation (2014–2015).
Rajko Dujmić, 65, Croatian songwriter, composer and music producer (Novi fosili), traffic collision.
Dick Goddard, 89, American meteorologist (WJW), writer and cartoonist.
Jean-Paul Grangaud, 82, Algerian doctor and professor.
Hu Ping, 90, Chinese politician, Minister of Commerce (1988–1993) and Governor of Fujian (1983–1987).
Willie Hunter, 80, Scottish football player (Motherwell, national team) and manager (Queen of the South).
Eddie Ilarde, 85, Filipino broadcaster (Student Canteen) and politician, member of the House of Representatives (1965–1969) and Senate (1972).
Kuo Mei-chiang, 66–67, Taiwanese pastor.
Irene D. Long, 69, American physician.
Abdul Mannan, 77–78, Bangladeshi politician, Minister of Civil Aviation and Tourism (1991–1996).
Maurice Megennis, 90, English Olympic weightlifter (1952, 1956).
Pat O'Day, 86, American broadcaster (KJR).
Sunnam Rajaiah, 59, Indian politician, Andhra Pradesh MLA (1999–2009, since 2014), COVID-19.
Vangapandu Prasada Rao, 77, Indian poet and lyricist.
Irena Sedlecká, 91, Czech sculptor. 
Karam Ali Shah, 86, Pakistani politician, Governor of Gilgit-Baltistan (2011–2015). 
Moustapha Sourang, 71, Senegalese politician.
Andre Spencer, 56, American basketball player (Atlanta Hawks, Golden State Warriors, Sacramento Kings).
Jan Strelau, 89, Polish psychologist.
Bob Sykes, 93, American football player (Washington Redskins).
Ilse Uyttersprot, 53, Belgian politician, member of the Chamber of Representatives (2007–2010), mayor of Aalst (2007–2012), beaten.
Sergio Zavoli, 96, Italian journalist and politician, President of RAI (1980–1986) and Senator (2001–2018).
Alberto Zumarán, 79, Uruguayan politician, Senator (1984–1994).
Notable people killed in the 2020 Beirut explosion:
Jean-Marc Bonfils, 57, French architect.
Nazar Najarian, 63, Lebanese politician, secretary-general of the Kataeb Party (since 2018).

5
Hawa Abdi, 73, Somali human rights activist.
Gésio Amadeu, 73, Brazilian actor (They Don't Wear Black Tie), COVID-19.
Eric Bentley, 103, British-born American theatre critic (The New Republic) and playwright.
Dóra S. Bjarnason, 73, Icelandic sociologist.
Isidora Bjelica, 52, Serbian writer and playwright, cancer.
Claudine Cassereau, 66, French model and pageant winner, Miss France (1972).
John Chang Yik, 86, South Korean Roman Catholic prelate, Bishop of Chunchon (1994–2010).
Mario Chianese, 91, Italian painter and carver.
Horace Clarke, 81, American baseball player (New York Yankees, San Diego Padres).
Sadia Dehlvi, 63, Indian writer and columnist, cancer.
Michael Freilich, 66, American oceanographer, pancreatic cancer.
Pete Hamill, 85, American journalist (New York Post, New York Daily News), Grammy Award winner (1976), complications from a broken hip.
Agathonas Iakovidis, 65, Greek folk singer ("Alcohol Is Free"), heart attack.
Sümer Koçak, 58, Turkish Olympic wrestler (1984, 1988).
Cecil Leonard, 74, American football player (New York Jets, Birmingham Americans) and coach (A. H. Parker High School).
Stefan Majer, 90, Polish basketball player (Legia Warszawa) and trainer (national team).
Philippe Mongin, 70, French economist.
E. T. Narayanan Mooss, 86, Indian Ayurvedic physician.
María Victoria Morera, 64, Spanish diplomat, Ambassador to Belgium (2004–2007) and Germany (2017–2018), cancer.
Shivajirao Patil Nilangekar, 89, Indian politician, Maharashtra Chief Minister (1985–1986) and MLA (1962–2014).
Elmer Petersen, 91, American sculptor (World's Largest Buffalo).
Anil Rathod, 70, Indian politician, Maharashtra MLA (1990–2014), cardiac arrest.
Pierre Robin, 92, French aeroplane designer.
Ken Robinson, 83, British Anglican priest.
Blanca Rodríguez, 94, Venezuelan socialite, First Lady (1974–1979, 1989–1993), respiratory failure.
Samir Sharma, 44, Indian actor (Kahaani Ghar Ghar Kii, Yeh Rishtey Hain Pyaar Ke, Hasee Toh Phasee), suicide by hanging. (body discovered on this date)
Frédéric Jacques Temple, 98, French poet and writer.
Dick Tooth, 90, Australian rugby union player (Sydney University, national team) and orthopedic surgeon.
Ivanka Vancheva, 66, Bulgarian Olympic javelin thrower (1980).
H. D. L. Vervliet, 96, Belgian antiquarian.
Vasily Vlasenko, 92, Soviet Olympic distance runner (1956).
Chip White, 73, American jazz drummer.
Aritana Yawalapiti, 70–71, Brazilian indigenous rights activist, cacique, and ecologist, COVID-19.

6
Boris Bobrinskoy, 95, French Eastern Orthodox theologian.
Lindsay Brown, 76, New Zealand accountant, chancellor of the University of Otago (2004–2008).
Bob Calhoun, 83, American politician, member of the Virginia Senate (1988–1996), prostate cancer.
Shyamal Chakraborty, 76, Indian politician, MP (2008–2014) and West Bengal MLA (1981–1996), COVID-19.
Amaresh Datta, 101, Indian literary critic and poet.
Louis Devoti, 93, French Olympic basketball player (1952).
Werner Düggelin, 90, Swiss theatre director.
Muslim Evloev, 25, Russian-born Kyrgyz wrestler, shot.
Toos Faber-de Heer, 91, Dutch journalist.
Wayne Fontana, 74, English singer ("The Game of Love"), cancer.
Brian Green, 46, American game developer.
Nikolai van der Heyde, 84, Dutch film director (To Grab the Ring, Love Comes Quietly, Help! The Doctor Is Drowning) and screenwriter.
Beverley Jackson, 91, American writer and journalist.
Miriam Jiménez Román, 69, Puerto Rican academic, cancer.
Joke Kersten, 76, Dutch politician, member of the House of Representatives (1990–1994).
Mukund Lath, 82, Indian cultural historian.
Wilbert McClure, 81, American boxer, Olympic champion (1960).
Edward Wilson Merrill, 96, American biomaterials scientist.
Louis Meznarie, 90, French automotive engineer.
John Nkadimeng, 93, South African politician and diplomat.
Solipeta Ramalinga Reddy, 57, Indian politician, Telangana MLA (since 2004), complications from circulatory surgery.
Judit Reigl, 97, Hungarian painter.
Lottie Louise Riekehof, 99, American ASL interpreter and author.
Vern Rumsey, 47, American bassist (Unwound, Fitz of Depression, Household Gods) and recording engineer.
Paul Schaffer, 95, Austrian-born French Holocaust survivor.
Brent Scowcroft, 95, American air force officer, National Security Adviser (1975–1977, 1989–1993).
Bernard Stiegler, 68, French philosopher (Technics and Time, 1).
Apisai Tora, 86, Fijian military officer and politician, MP (1972–1977, 2001–2006).
R. Venkataraman, 86, Indian cricketer (Madhya Pradesh, Vidarbha).
Pierre Viot, 95, French executive.

7
Abdullah Ahmed Abdullah, 57, Egyptian terrorist (Al-Qaeda), shot.
Nando Angelini, 86, Italian actor (Il Sorpasso, Barabbas, Bloody Pit of Horror).
Bernard Bailyn, 97, American historian, Pulitzer Prize winner (1968, 1987).
Stan Bevans, 86, English footballer (Stoke City, Macclesfield Town).
Edward Bruner, 95, American anthropologist.
Tony Charmoli, 99, American dancer and choreographer.
Deidre Davis Butler, 64, American disability rights advocate.
Naima El Bezaz, 46, Moroccan-Dutch writer, suicide.
Jean-Louis Ferrary, 72, French historian. 
Jean Gandois, 90, French industrial executive.
Ronnie Goodman, 60, American cartoonist and street artist.
Erich Gruenberg, 95, Austrian-born British violinist and teacher.
Tomáš Grulich, 69, Czech politician, Senator (2006–2018).
Charles K. Heiden, 95, American major general.
Tim Irwin, 80, Canadian Olympic sailor (1968).
Ramadhan Seif Kajembe, 66, Kenyan politician, MP (2007–2013).
Lungile Pepeta, 46, South African academic and paediatric cardiologist, executive dean of Nelson Mandela University, COVID-19.
Lê Khả Phiêu, 88, Vietnamese politician, General Secretary of the Communist Party of Vietnam (1997–2001).
Brian O'Brien, 86, Australian space scientist.
Michael Ojo, 27, Nigerian-American basketball player (FMP, Crvena zvezda), heart attack.
Nina Popova, 97, Russian-born American ballet dancer, COVID-19.
Ian Reed, 93, Australian Olympic discus thrower.
Carlo Rolandi, 94, Italian Olympic sailor (1960).
Lorenzo Soria, 68, Argentine-born Italian studio executive, President of the Hollywood Foreign Press Association (since 2019), lung cancer.
Adin Steinsaltz, 83, Israeli Chabad Chasidic rabbi, lung infection.
Fred Stillkrauth, 81, German actor (Cross of Iron).
Gennadi Touretski, 71, Russian swimming coach.
Constance Weldon, 88, American tuba player.
Harvey D. Williams, 90, American army major general and activist, Deputy Inspector General of the U.S. Army (1980), complications from Parkinson's disease.
Stephen F. Williams, 83, American jurist, Judge of the U.S. Court of Appeals for the District of Columbia Circuit (since 1986), complications from COVID-19.
Mark Wirtz, 76, French musician and record producer (A Teenage Opera), Pick's disease.
Mike Yaschuk, 97, Canadian ice hockey player (Saskatoon Quakers, Streatham Redhawks).

8
V. Balakrishnan, 80, Indian politician, Tamil Nadu MLA (1980–1988), heart attack.
Adrian Barber, 81, English musician and producer.
Salome Bey, 86, American-born Canadian singer.
Pedro Casaldáliga, 92, Spanish-Brazilian Roman Catholic prelate, missionary and human rights activist, Bishop of São Félix do Araguaia (1971–2005).
Adam Comrie, 30, Canadian ice hockey player (Rochester Americans, Syracuse Crunch, EC KAC), traffic collision.
Bernard Fils-Aimé, 67, Haitian entrepreneur and activist, COVID-19.
Stefan Getsov, 90, Bulgarian footballer (Slavia Sofia).
Lane Ryo Hirabayashi, 67, American historian, cancer.
Buruji Kashamu, 62, Nigerian politician, Senator (2015–2019), COVID-19.
Bert Laeyendecker, 90, Dutch sociologist.
Tekii Lazaro, 66, Cook Islands politician, MP (2011–2018).
Anthony Lester, Baron Lester of Herne Hill, 84, British barrister, member of the House of Lords (1993–2018).
Alfredo Lim, 90, Filipino politician, Senator (2004–2007) and Mayor of Manila (1992–1998, 2007–2013), COVID-19.
Morris McInnes, 80, British-American academic, cancer.
Gabriel Ochoa Uribe, 90, Colombian football player and manager (América, Millonarios, national team).
Wayne Redmond, 74, American baseball player (Detroit Tigers).
Konrad Steffen, 68, Swiss glaciologist, fall.
Jean Stewart, 89, New Zealand swimmer, Olympic bronze medalist (1952).
Robert J. Sunell, 91, American military officer.
Ruby Takanishi, 74, American developmental psychologist.
Chica Xavier, 88, Brazilian actress (O Rei do Gado, Força de um Desejo, Um Só Coração), cancer.
Nandi Yellaiah, 78, Indian politician, MP (2014–2019), COVID-19.

9
Alauddin Ali, 67, Bangladeshi composer (Golapi Ekhon Traine, Sundori, Koshai), lung complications.
Fips Asmussen, 82, German comedian, cancer.
Rachid Belhout, 76, Algerian football player and manager (ES Sétif, ASO Chlef, CS Constantine), traffic collision.
Kenneth Bernard, 90, American playwright, cardiovascular disease.
Martin Birch, 71, British music producer and engineer (Deep Purple, Whitesnake, Iron Maiden).
Anna Maria Bottini, 104, Italian actress (The Leopard, The Law, Angels of Darkness).
Norman Carlson, 86, American correctional officer and businessman (GEO Group), Director of the FBP (1970–1987), lymphoma.
Calaway H. Dodson, 91, American orchidologist.
Murray Eden, 99, American physical chemist.
Robert Fischer, 83, Canadian politician.
Göran Forsmark, 65, Swedish actor (The Hunters).
Fernando Garfella Palmer, 31, Spanish underwater documentary filmmaker and maritime activist, diving accident.
Brendan Halligan, 84, Irish economist and politician, Senator (1973–1977) and MEP (1979–1984).
Carroll Hardy, 87, American baseball player (Cleveland Indians, Boston Red Sox, Houston Astros), complications from dementia.
Heta Hingston, 82, New Zealand judge.
Cannon Hinnant, 5, American child, shot.
Jeff Jacobson, 74, American photographer, cancer.
Kamala, 70, American professional wrestler (WWF, CWA, WCCW), COVID-19.
Nouria Kazdarli, 99, Algerian actress.
Bhai Lal, 67, Indian politician, Uttar Pradesh MLA (1996–2002) and MP (2007–2009).
Iain Laughland, 84, Scottish rugby union player and administrator.
John C. Loehlin, 94, American behavior geneticist and computer scientist.
Kurt Luedtke, 80, American screenwriter (Out of Africa, Absence of Malice) and newspaper editor (Detroit Free Press), Oscar winner (1986).
Kemal Özçelik, 98, Turkish Olympic equestrian (1956).
Mieko Takizawa, 81, Japanese novelist.
Duane Tatro, 93, American composer (Dan August, The Manhunter, The Love Boat).
Zaōnishiki Toshimasa, 67, Japanese sumo wrestler, multiple myeloma.
Franca Valeri, 100, Italian actress (Il vedovo, The Shortest Day, Gli onorevoli).
Laurent Vicomte, 64, French comic book writer.
Frank Wright, 87, American painter, heart failure and pneumonia.

10
Nadjmi Adhani, 50, Indonesian politician, mayor of Banjarbaru (since 2016), COVID-19.
Raymond Allen, 91, American actor (Sanford and Son, Good Times, Starsky & Hutch), respiratory illness.
Dariusz Baliszewski, 74, Polish historian, journalist and writer.
Waldemar Bastos, 66, Angolan musician, cancer.
Oscar Baylón Chacón, 91, Mexican politician and agronomist, Governor of Baja California (1989).
Lorna Beal, 96, Australian cricketer (national team).
Silvana Bosi, 86, Italian actress (The Talented Mr. Ripley, Mortacci, Bread and Tulips).
Pierre Decazes, 88, French actor (The Shameless Old Lady, The Wing or the Thigh).
Paddy Doyle, 79, Irish hurler (Tipperary).
Imre Farkas, 85, Hungarian canoeist, Olympic bronze medalist (1956, 1960).
Mike Finley, 70, American poet, complications from prostate cancer.
Yisroel Moshe Friedman, 65, American-Israeli religious leader, Rebbe of Sadigura (since 2013), pancreatic cancer.
Dieter Krause, 84, German sprint canoeist, Olympic champion (1960).
Jacobo Langsner, 93, Romanian-born Uruguayan playwright.
Barry B. Levine, 79, American sociologist.
Vinka Lucas, 88, Croatian-born New Zealand fashion and bridal wear designer and retailer.
Tripp Merritt, 52, American football coach.
Maxie Minnaar, 47, Namibian politician.
Neil Ocampo, 62, Filipino radio broadcaster (Todo Balita).
Buck Olsen, 94, Canadian politician.
Vladica Popović, 85, Serbian football player (Red Star Belgrade, Yugoslavia national team) and manager (Deportivo Cali).
Alfred Püls, 86, Austrian Olympic ice hockey player (1956, 1964).
Uri Ra'anan, 94, Austrian-born American political scientist.
Luis Abilio Sebastiani Aguirre, 85, Peruvian Roman Catholic prelate, Archbishop of Ayacucho o Huamanga (2001–2011).
P. J. Sheehan, 87, Irish politician, TD (1981–2002, 2007–2011).
Alexander Taraikovsky, 34, Belarusian protester, shot.
Mike Tindall, 79, English footballer (Aston Villa, Walsall, Tamworth), complications from dementia.
Tetsuya Watari, 78, Japanese actor (Tokyo Drifter, Outlaw: Gangster VIP, Katsu Kaishū), pneumonia.

11
Marcel Adams, 100, Canadian real estate investor.
Gordon J. Brand, 65, English golfer.
Floyd Breeland, 87, American politician, member of the South Carolina House of Representatives (1992–2008).
Sixto Brillantes, 80, Filipino civil servant, Chairman of COMELEC (2011–2015), COVID-19.
Walter Carrington, 90, American diplomat, ambassador to Senegal (1980–1981) and Nigeria (1993–1997).
Salah Chaoua, 73, Tunisian footballer (Club Africain, Al-Madina SC, national team).
Dinos Christianopoulos, 89, Greek poet, translator and publisher.
George Christy, 93, American columnist (The Hollywood Reporter, The Beverly Hills Courier) and actor (Die Hard), heart failure.
Édouard de Lépine, 88, Martinican historian and politician, Mayor of Le Robert (1989–1995).
Dhammika Ganganath Dissanayake, 62, Sri Lankan diplomat, ambassador to Japan (since 2015).
Belle du Berry, 54, French singer (Paris Combo), cancer.
Don Edmunds, 89, American race car driver.
Oliviu Gherman, 90, Romanian politician and diplomat, Senator (1990–2001) and President of the Senate (1992–1996).
Gaspard Hons, 82, Belgian poet.
Mitch Hoopes, 67, American football player (Dallas Cowboys, San Diego Chargers, Philadelphia Eagles).
Rahat Indori, 70, Indian lyricist (Khuddar, Mission Kashmir, Meenaxi: A Tale of Three Cities) and poet, COVID-19.
Anneliese Kaplan, 87, German actress.
Peter Kazembe, 65, Malawian pediatrician, cancer.
Edmond Kiraz, 96, Egyptian-born French cartoonist and illustrator.
Russell Kirsch, 91, American computer scientist, inventor of the pixel and developer of the image scanner, complications from Alzheimer's disease.
Antônio Leite Andrade, 73, Brazilian doctor and politician, Senator (2005), cardiac problems.
Trini Lopez, 83, American singer ("If I Had a Hammer", "Lemon Tree") and actor (The Dirty Dozen), complications from COVID-19.
Paul Melba, 84, English comedian and impressionist.
Geoffrey Nunberg, 75, American linguist, cancer.
Juan Pastor Marco, 68, Spanish politician, Deputy (1977–1982).
Sumner Redstone, 97, American media executive (CBS, Viacom, National Amusements).
Alex Sandusky, 87, American football player (Baltimore Colts).
Michel Van Aerde, 86, Belgian racing cyclist.
Prince Waldemar of Schaumburg-Lippe, 79, German-born Danish royal.
Helmut Wallner, 74, Austrian footballer (Wiener Sport-Club, national team).
Helen Yate, 99, British Olympic swimmer (1948).

12
William Arnett, 81, American art collector and writer.
Lloyd W. Bailey, 92, American physician and faithless elector.
Pavol Biroš, 67, Slovak footballer (Slavia Praha, Lokomotíva Košice, Czechoslovakia national team), heart disease.
Sybil Brintrup, 66, Chilean conceptual artist.
Josef Bulva, 77, Czech pianist.
Carlos Burity, 67, Angolan musician.
Dame Mary Drummond Corsar, 93, Scottish philanthropist.
Francisco José Cox, 86, Chilean Roman Catholic laicized prelate, Archbishop of La Serena (1990–1997).
Marvin Creamer, 104, American sailor.
Ellis Faas, 58, Dutch make-up artist.
François-Mathurin Gourvès, 91, French Roman Catholic prelate, Bishop of Vannes (1991–2005).
Mary Hartline, 92, American model and actress.
Lynn M. Hilton, 95, American politician and author.
Mac Jack, 55, South African politician, Northern Cape MPL (since 2013), COVID-19.
Gergely Kulcsár, 86, Hungarian javelin thrower, Olympic silver medallist (1964).
Edmondo Lorenzini, 82, Italian footballer.
Mónica Miguel, 84, Mexican actress (I Dream in Another Language, Más allá del puente, Under Fire).
Gulsaira Momunova, 82, Kyrgyz journalist, translator and poet, kidney complications from COVID-19.
Howard Mudd, 78, American football player (San Francisco 49ers, Chicago Bears) and coach (Indianapolis Colts), traffic collision.
Melvin F. Stute, 93, American racehorse trainer.
Rajiv Tyagi, 52, Indian politician, cardiac arrest.
Ivan Tymchenko, 81, Ukrainian jurist, chairman of the Constitutional Court (1996–1999).
Gian Carlo Vacchelli, 38, Peruvian sports commentator and politician, Deputy (2011–2016), cardiac arrest.
Robert Williams, 90, American psychologist.
Gordon Yea, 95, Australian footballer.
Igor Yefimov, 83, Russian-American philosopher, historian and writer.
Bill Yeoman, 92, American Hall of Fame college football player (Texas A&M) and coach (Michigan State, Houston), pneumonia and kidney failure.
Adrian Young, 77, Australian footballer (St Kilda).

13
Shigeo Anzai, 81, Japanese photographer, heart failure.
Frank Brew, 92, Australian football player (South Melbourne), COVID-19.
Ash Christian, 35, American actor (The Good Wife), filmmaker and producer.
Ogden Compton, 88, American football player (Chicago Cardinals).
Ali Dastmalchian, 65, Iranian academic.
Michel Dumont, 79, Canadian actor (Chocolate Eclair, Without Her, Café de Flore).
Chris Eccleshall, 72, English luthier.
Essam el-Erian, 66, Egyptian politician, MP (2011–2013), heart attack.
Peter Excell, 72, British engineer and scientist.
Jacques Faivre, 87, French footballer (OGC Nice).
Elizabeth Fell, 80, Australian activist and journalist.
Giancarlo Ferrando, 80, Italian cinematographer (Torso, All the Colors of the Dark, The Violent Professionals).
Bernd Fischer, 83, German mathematician.
Steve Grossman, 69, American jazz saxophonist.
Daryl Gutterson, 67, Australian footballer (Carlton), cardiac arrest.
Luchita Hurtado, 99, Venezuelan-born American painter.
Gulnazar Keldi, 74, Tajik poet and lyricist, author of the "Surudi Milli" national anthem, COVID-19.
Michael Lombard, 86, American actor (Filthy Rich, Crocodile Dundee, Pet Sematary).
Nettie Mayersohn, 96, American politician, member of the New York State Assembly (1983–2011).
Quentin McCord, 42, American football player (Kentucky Wildcats, Atlanta Falcons, Winnipeg Blue Bombers).
Phil O'Brien, 89, Australian footballer (Hawthorn).
Colin Parry, 79, English footballer (Stockport County, Rochdale).
Irene Piotrowski, 79, Canadian Olympic runner (1964, 1968).
Dimasangcay Pundato, 72, Filipino revolutionary leader and politician.
Mark O. Robbins, 64, American physicist.
Elaine Roulet, 89, American Roman Catholic nun and prison reform activist.
Lorraine Thomson, 89, Canadian dancer and television host.
Darío Vivas, 70, Venezuelan politician, head of government of the Capital District (since 2020), COVID-19.
Richard M. Weiner, 90, Romanian-born German theoretical physicist.
Jackie Wren, 84, Scottish footballer (Hibernian).

14
Francesc Badia Batalla, 97, Spanish-born Andorran civil servant and magistrate, Episcopal Veguer (1972–1993).
Howell Binkley, 64, American lighting designer (Hamilton, Jersey Boys, In the Heights), Tony winner (2006, 2016), lung cancer.
Julian Bream, 87, English classical guitarist and lutenist.
Dan Budnik, 87, American photographer.
Angela Buxton, 85, British tennis player, Wimbledon and French Open women's doubles champion (1956).
William Davies, 89, Australian Olympic wrestler (1956).
Ewa Demarczyk, 79, Polish singer and poet.
Arthur Docters van Leeuwen, 75, Dutch civil servant, head of the General Intelligence and Security Service (1989–1995) and chair of the Authority for the Financial Markets (1999–2007).
Tom Forsyth, 71, Scottish footballer (Motherwell, Rangers, national team).
Sonny Fox, 73, American disc jockey (Sirius XM, WKIS, WJMK), liver failure.
Surendra Prakash Goel, 74, Indian politician, MP (2004–2009), COVID-19.
Ernst Jean-Joseph, 72, Haitian football player (Violette A.C., Chicago Sting, national team) and manager.
Kenneth Kunen, 77, American mathematician.
Valentina Legkostupova, 54, Russian pop singer, Merited Artist of the Russian Federation (2001).
Moisés Mamani, 50, Peruvian politician, Deputy (2016–2019), COVID-19.
Linda Manz, 58, American actress (Days of Heaven, Out of the Blue, Gummo), pneumonia and lung cancer.
Joe Norton, 70, Canadian politician, Kahnawake grand chief (1980–2004, since 2015), fall.
Kalevi Oikarainen, 84, Finnish cross-country skier, world champion (1970), Olympic bronze medalist (1968).
Herb Orvis, 73, American Hall of Fame football player (Colorado Buffaloes, Detroit Lions, Baltimore Colts).
Ferenc Petrovácz, 76, Hungarian Olympic sports shooter (1968).
Robert R. Shahan, 80, American Anglican prelate, Bishop of Arizona (1992–2004).
Shwikar, 81, Egyptian actress (Viva Zalata).
Nesim Tahirović, 78, Bosnian painter.
John Talbut, 79, English footballer (Burnley, West Bromwich Albion, K.V. Mechelen), complications from dementia.
James R. Thompson, 84, American politician, Governor of Illinois (1977–1991) and Chair of the Intelligence Oversight Board (1990–1993).
Pete Way, 69, English rock bass guitarist (UFO, Waysted, Fastway), injuries sustained in accident.

15
Mercedes Barcha, 87, Colombian muse, wife of Gabriel García Márquez.
Murtaja Baseer, 87, Bangladeshi painter and artist, COVID-19.
Bill Bowman, 74, American politician, member of the North Dakota Senate (1990–2018).
Arthur W. Chickering, 93, American educator.
Stuart Christie, 74, Scottish anarchist and writer.
Dick Coury, 90, American football coach (Philadelphia Eagles).
Antonije Đurić, 91, Serbian journalist, author, historian and publicist.
Ruth Gavison, 75, Israeli law professor, Israel Prize recipient (2011).
Richard Gwyn, 86, Canadian author, journalist and historian.
Elton Hobson, 95, Canadian football player (Winnipeg Blue Bombers).
Abu Bakar Juah, 72, Malaysian actor, colon cancer.
Vi June, 88, American politician.
Wilberforce Juta, 76, Nigerian politician, Governor of Gongola State (1983).
Grace Montañez Davis, 93, American politician, heart failure.
Francis O'Brien, 92, Canadian politician.
Svetozar Obradović, 69, Serbian comic book writer.
Chilla Porter, 84, Australian high jumper, Olympic silver medalist (1956), cancer.
Lefty Reid, 92, Canadian museum curator (Hockey Hall of Fame), cancer.
Vimala Sharma, 93, Indian social worker and politician, First Lady (1992–1997), Minister of State of the Ministry of Consumer Affairs, Food and Public Distribution (1993-1996) and Second Lady (1987–1997).
F. Neale Smith, 89, American rear admiral.
Robert Trump, 71, American business executive (The Trump Organization).
Henryk Wujec, 79, Polish politician, member of the Sejm (1989–2001).
Henk Wullems, 84, Dutch football player (KFG) and manager (Go Ahead Eagles, Indonesia national team), complications from a stroke.

16
Charles Allen, 80, British writer and historian.
Hervé Blanc, 65, French actor (A Week's Vacation).
Danny Campbell, 76, English footballer (West Bromwich Albion, Stockport County), pulmonary embolism.
Tommy Carroll, 77, Irish footballer (national team, Shelbourne, Birmingham City).
Chetan Chauhan, 73, Indian cricketer (Maharashtra, Delhi, national team), multiple organ failure caused by COVID-19.
Nikolai Gubenko, 78, Russian actor, director, and screenwriter (A Soldier Came Back from the Front, Wounded Game, Life on Holidays), People's Artist of the RSFSR (1985).
Aubrey Hill, 48, American college football player and coach (Florida Gators), cancer.
Viorica Ionică, 65, Romanian Olympic handball player (1976).
Ladislav Jirků, 74, Czech academic and politician, Deputy (2010–2013).
Deirdre Le Faye, 86, English writer and biographer (Jane Austen).
Nina McClelland, 90, American chemist.
Bahman Mofid, 78, Iranian actor (Qeysar, Reza Motorcyclist, Wood Pigeon), lung cancer.
B. Ahmed Hajee Mohiudeen, 87, Indian conglomerate executive and philanthropist.
Esther Morales, 70, Bolivian small businesswoman and farmer, First Lady (2006–2019), COVID-19.
Caio Narcio, 33, Brazilian politician, Deputy (2015–2019), meningoencephalitis complicated by COVID-19.
Aisultan Nazarbayev, 29, Kazakh footballer and sporting executive.
Emman Nimedez, 21, Filipino YouTuber, acute myeloid leukemia.
James Partridge, 67, British charity executive (Changing Faces).
Ary de Sá, 92, Brazilian Olympic long jumper (1952, 1956).
Jean-Michel Savéant, 86, French electrochemist.
Gershon Shafat, 92, Austrian-born Israeli politician, member of the Knesset (1984–1992).
Claire Shulman, 94, American politician, Queens borough president (1986–2002), cancer.
Cathy Smith, 73, Canadian backup singer and convicted criminal.
Pierre-Yves Trémois, 99, French visual artist and sculptor.
Georg Volkert, 74, German footballer (1. FC Nürnberg, Hamburg, West Germany national team), complications from a heart attack.
Ornella Volta, 93, Italian-born French musicologist and expert on Erik Satie.
Xavier, 42, American professional wrestler (ROH).
John K. Yambasu, 63, Sierra Leonean bishop of the United Methodist Church, traffic collision.
Alexander Grey Zulu, 95, Zambian politician, Minister of Commerce and Industry  (1964) and Defence (1970–1973).

17
Folke Alnevik, 100, Swedish sprinter, Olympic bronze medallist (1948), complications from a bedsore.
Zara Alvarez, 39, Filipino human rights activist, shot.
Norberto Ángeles, 43, Mexican footballer, heart attack.
Pavel Branko, 99, Italian-born Slovak film critic.
Mário de Araújo Cabral, 86, Portuguese Formula One racing driver.
Ali Chaouch, 72, Tunisian politician, Minister of the Interior (1997–1999).
Fred Clarke, 87, Australian footballer (Richmond).
Hugh Cochrane, 77, Scottish footballer (Dundee United, Barnsley, Margate).
Elsimar M. Coutinho, 90, Brazilian gynecologist, complications from COVID-19.
Barbara Doherty, 88, American Roman Catholic religious sister and educator, President of Saint Mary-of-the-Woods College (1984–1998).
Boyd Grant, 87, American college basketball coach (Fresno State, Colorado State), complications from a stroke.
Jasraj, 90, Indian classical vocalist, cardiac arrest.
Nishikant Kamat, 50, Indian film director (Evano Oruvan, Mumbai Meri Jaan, Rocky Handsome), cirrhosis.
Chaim Dov Keller, 90, American Haredi rabbi, COVID-19.
Nina Kraft, 51, German triathlete.
Claude Laverdure, 73, Belgian comic book author.
Randall Rollins, 88, American pest control executive, Chairman of Rollins Inc. (since 1991).
Savvas Theodoridis, 85, Greek footballer (Olympiacos, national team).
Richard M. White, 90, American electrical engineer, complications from a fall.
Jorge Zalszupin, 98, Polish-born Brazilian architect and designer.

18
Glenn Bassett, 93, American tennis player and coach.
Richard Biefnot, 71, Belgian politician, member of the Parliament of Wallonia (1999–2004).
Bob Bigelow, 66, American basketball player (Kansas City Kings, Boston Celtics, San Diego Clippers).
Hans Cavalli-Björkman, 92, Swedish lawyer and football club chairman (Malmö FF), 1975–1998.
Ben Cross, 72, English actor (Chariots of Fire, Star Trek, First Knight), cancer.
Michael Diven, 50, American politician, member of the Pennsylvania House of Representatives (2001–2006), cancer.
Mariolina De Fano, 79, Italian actress (Tutto l'amore che c'è, The Cézanne Affair, Make a Fake).
Gheorghe Dogărescu, 60, Romanian handball player, Olympic bronze medallist (1984).
Madhav Prasad Ghimire, 100, Nepalese poet (Gauri), respiratory failure.
Ron Gorchov, 90, American artist.
Joseph Gosnell, 84, Canadian Nisga'a indigenous leader (Nisga'a Final Agreement), cancer.
Steve Gulley, 57, American bluegrass singer-songwriter, pancreatic cancer.
Dale Hawerchuk, 57, Canadian Hall of Fame ice hockey player (Winnipeg Jets, Buffalo Sabres, Philadelphia Flyers) and coach, stomach cancer.
Andrew Henderson, 98, Scottish cricketer (national team).
Soeki Irodikromo, 75, Surinamese painter.
M. A. Jabbar, 87, Bangladeshi politician and convicted war criminal, MP (1986–1990).
Howie Judson, 95, American baseball player (Chicago White Sox, Cincinnati Redlegs).
Wojciech Karpiński, 77, Polish writer and historian of ideas.
Sayeeda Khanam, 82, Bangladeshi photographer, kidney disease.
Eugene S. Mills, 95, American academic administrator, President of the University of New Hampshire (1974–1980).
Amvrosius Parashkevov, 78, Bulgarian Orthodox prelate, Metropolitan Bishop of Dorostol (since 2010), complications from COVID-19.
Rick Pugliese, 67, Canadian Olympic water polo player (1972, 1976).
Roger Quigley, 51, English singer and songwriter.
Azizur Rahman, 76, Bangladeshi politician, MP (1986–1988, 1991–1996), COVID-19.
Patsy Robertson, 86, Jamaican diplomat and journalist.
Cesare Romiti, 97, Italian economist and automobile manufacturing executive, Chairman of Fiat (1996–1998).
Jack Sherman, 64, American guitarist (Red Hot Chili Peppers), heart attack.
Hal Singer, 100, American saxophonist.
Mohammad-Ali Taskhiri, 75, Iranian Islamic cleric, member of the Assembly of Experts (1999–2007, since 2016), heart attack.
Alan Trachtenberg, 88, American historian.
Ivan Varlamov, 82, Russian football player (Spartak Moscow, USSR national team) and manager (Spartak Vladikavkaz).
Han Woerdman, 77, Dutch physicist, Parkinson's disease.

19
Fern Cunningham, 71, American sculptor (Harriet Tubman Memorial).
Kosei Eguchi, 23, Japanese manga artist.
Cora Etter, 95, Canadian politician.
Durbin Feeling, 74, American Cherokee linguist.
Randall Craig Fleischer, 61, American conductor (Anchorage Symphony Orchestra).
Allan Fotheringham, 87, Canadian journalist (Maclean's, The Globe and Mail, Toronto Sun).
Gerald Gaus, 67, American philosopher.
Slade Gorton, 92, American politician, member of the U.S. Senate (1981–1987, 1989–2001) and Attorney General of Washington (1969–1981).
Christopher Guy Harrison, 59, British furniture designer, lung cancer.
Helmut Hubacher, 94, Swiss politician, member of the Swiss National Council (1963–1997).
Gopalaswamy Kasturirangan, 89, Indian cricketer (Mysore, South Zone), heart attack.
Justin Lall, 33, American bridge player, liver disease.
Lyutviyan Mollova, 72, Bulgarian Olympic javelin thrower (1972).
Gwen Moore, 79, American politician, member of the California State Assembly (1978–1994).
Todd Nance, 57, American drummer (Widespread Panic).
Atzo Nicolaï, 60, Dutch politician and board member, Minister for Civil Reform and Kingdom Relations (2006–2007), cancer
Borys Paton, 101, Ukrainian scientist, Chairman of the National Academy of Sciences of Ukraine (since 1962).
Nadir Salifov, 47, Georgian-Azerbaijani mobster, shot.
Gennady Shutov, 44, Belarusian protester, shot.
Agnes Simon, 85, Hungarian table tennis player, world champion (1957).
Richard Taub, 83, American sociologist.
Makoto Ueda, 89, Japanese-American poetry critic.
François van Hoobrouck d'Aspre, 86, Belgian politician and baron.
Reham Yacoub, 29, Iraqi civil rights activist and doctor, shot.
Masakazu Yamazaki, 86, Japanese playwright and literary critic.
Bernard Zimmern, 90, French refrigeration engineer.

20
Frankie Banali, 68, American drummer (Quiet Riot, W.A.S.P.), pancreatic cancer.
Ágnes Bánfai, 73, Hungarian Olympic gymnast (1968).
Hasil Bizenjo, 62, Pakistani politician, Senator (since 2009) and Minister of Maritime Affairs (2016–2018), lung cancer.
Frank Cullotta, 81, American mobster (Chicago Outfit), COVID-19.
Chi Chi DeVayne, 34, American drag queen (RuPaul's Drag Race), pneumonia.
Justin Townes Earle, 38, American singer-songwriter.
Joe Englert, 59, American restaurateur, complications from surgery.
Jack Gibbs, 92, American sociologist.
Zalman Nechemia Goldberg, 89, Israeli rabbi.
Desmond Guinness, 88, British-Irish author.
Alan Harre, 80, American pastor and academic administrator.
Tony Hart, 87, Jamaican businessman, philanthropist, and politician.
Harold Janeway, 84, American politician, member of the New Hampshire Senate (2006–2010).
A. Rahman Khan, 77, Indian politician, Tamil Nadu MLA (1977–1991, 1996–2001), heart attack.
Branko Kostić, 80, Montenegrin politician, Acting President of the Presidency of Yugoslavia (1991–1992), complications from a stroke.
Mary E. McAllister, 83, American politician, member of the North Carolina House of Representatives (1991–2009).
Edgar Olson, 82, American politician, member of the Minnesota House of Representatives (1985–1998).
György Rehus-Uzor, 74, Hungarian Olympic weightlifter (1976).
Gary Reynolds, 53, American football coach (Green Bay Packers), cancer.
Miron Sher, 68, Soviet-born American chess grandmaster.
Janmejay Singh, 75, Indian politician, Uttar Pradesh MLA (since 2012), cardiac arrest.
Piotr Szczepanik, 78, Polish singer and actor.
Herbert Tabor, 101, American biochemist.
Andrzej Walicki, 90, Polish historian and philosopher.
Arnold R. Weber, 90, American academic administrator, President of Northwestern University (1984–1994), lung failure.

21
Aldo Aureggi, 88, Italian fencer, Olympic silver medallist (1960).
Antonio Bayter Abud, 86, Colombian Roman Catholic prelate, Vicar Apostolic of Inírida (1996–2013).
Mohamed Ben Rehaiem, 69, Tunisian footballer (Sfaxien, Al-Nassr, national team).
Jack Dryburgh, 81, Scottish Hall of Fame ice hockey player (Murrayfield Racers, Nottingham Panthers, Southampton Vikings) and coach.
Sir Bob Elliott, 86, Australian-born New Zealand medical researcher.
Mohamed Gueddiche, 78, Tunisian cardiologist, presidential doctor.
Ulric Haynes, 89, American diplomat.
Remy Hermoso, 72, Venezuelan baseball player (Montreal Expos, Cleveland Indians, Atlanta Braves).
Chris Kooy, 38, Canadian soccer player (Edmonton, Calgary Mustangs), cancer.
Bryan Lee, 77, American blues musician.
Thomas H. Olbricht, 90, American religious academic.
Colin Porter, 89, British Olympic rower (1960).
Sir Ken Robinson, 70, British educationalist and author, cancer.
Tomasz Tomiak, 52, Polish rower, Olympic bronze medallist (1992), heart failure.
Ron Tudor, 96, Australian music producer, label owner (Fable Records), and record industry executive.
Jacques Visschers, 79, Dutch footballer (NAC Breda).
Karen J. Warren, 72, American philosopher and ecofeminist, multiple system atrophy.

22
Jan D. Achenbach, 85, Dutch-American acoustical engineer and academic.
Edward Alexander, 83, American writer and academic, complications from surgery.
Ahmed Badouj, 70, Moroccan actor, director and screenwriter, COVID-19.
John Bangsund, 81, Australian science fiction fan, COVID-19.
Jean-Marie Brochu, 93–94, Canadian Roman Catholic priest, founder of Le Noël du Bonheur.
Thomas K. Gilhool, 81, American disability rights attorney, heart attack.
Ted Grace, 89, Australian politician, member of the House of Representatives (1984–1998).
John Green, 74, Australian politician, member of the Tasmanian House of Assembly (1974–1980).
Mrinal Haque, 61, Bangladeshi sculptor, complications from diabetes.
Józefa Hennelowa, 95, Polish publicist and journalist (Tygodnik Powszechny), member of the Sejm (1989–1993).
Emil Jula, 40, Romanian footballer (Universitatea Cluj, Oțelul Galați, Energie Cottbus), heart failure.
Karim Kamalov, 66, Uzbek politician, Mayor of Bukhara (1997–2011, 2017–2020), Governor of Bukhara Region (since 2020), COVID-19.
Cleve Loney, 69, American politician, member of the Montana House of Representatives (2011–2013), drowned.
Walter Lure, 71, American guitarist (The Heartbreakers), lung and liver cancer.
Pierre Maresca, 79, French New Caledonian politician.
Alessandro Mazzinghi, 81, Italian boxer, WBA and WBC world light-middleweight champion (1963–1965, 1968), stroke.
Pedro Nájera, 91, Mexican footballer (Club América, national team).
John Ohala, 79, American linguist.
Ulla Pia, 75, Danish singer ("Stop – mens legen er go'"), cancer.
Magdalen Redman, 90, American baseball player (Kenosha Comets, Grand Rapids Chicks).
Allan Rich, 94, American actor (Serpico, Quiz Show, Amistad), dementia.
D. J. Rogers, 72, American soul singer and producer.
Steve Sample Sr., 90, American bandleader and arranger.
Julie Schmit-Albin, 63, American anti-abortion activist, cancer.
Roger Unger, 96, American endocrinologist.

23
Peter Borwein, 67, Scottish-born Canadian mathematician, pneumonia.
Bill Burega, 88, Canadian ice hockey player (Toronto Maple Leafs).
Augusto Caminito, 81, Italian film director, producer, and screenwriter (Vampire in Venice, Hallelujah for Django).
Benny Chan, 58, Hong Kong film director (What a Hero!, Gen-X Cops, New Police Story), nasopharyngeal carcinoma.
Eugene A. Cook, 82, American lawyer and jurist, Justice of the Supreme Court of Texas (1988–1992).
Sir Neil Douglas, 71, Scottish physician, President of the Royal College of Physicians of Edinburgh (2004–2010).
Frank Dunphy, 82, Irish business manager and accountant (Damien Hirst).
Rolf Gohs, 86, Swedish comic creator and cover artist (Fantomen). 
John H. Hager, 83, American politician, Lieutenant Governor of Virginia (1998–2002).
Gerald D. Hines, 95, American real estate developer, founder of Hines Interests Limited Partnership.
Maria Janion, 93, Polish scholar and critic.
Peter King, 80, English jazz saxophonist.
Bernard Lieder, 97, American politician, member of the Minnesota House of Representatives (1985–2011).
Zuray Marcano, 66, Venezuelan Paralympic powerlifter (2016).
Fujio Matsuda, 95, American engineer and academic administrator, President of the University of Hawaii (1974–1984).
Greg Montgomery, 55, American football player (Houston Oilers, Detroit Lions, Baltimore Ravens).
Lori Nelson, 87, American actress (Revenge of the Creature, How to Marry a Millionaire, I Died a Thousand Times).
Nursholeh, 63, Indonesian politician, Mayor of Tegal (2017–2019).
Charlie Persip, 91, American jazz drummer.
Giannis Poulopoulos, 79, Greek singer-songwriter, cardiac arrest.
Preston Powell, 83, American football player (Cleveland Browns).
Valentina Prudskova, 81, Russian fencer, Olympic champion (1960) and silver medallist (1964).
A. B. Raj, 95, Indian film director (Ormikkaan Omanikkaan, Manasse Ninakku Mangalam, Aval Oru Devaalayam), heart attack. 
Luigi Serafini, 69, Italian Olympic basketball player (1972, 1976).
Bill Stephen, 92, Australian football player (Fitzroy) and coach (Essendon).
Olayinka Sule, 72, Nigerian military officer, Administrator of Jigawa State (1991–1992).
John Tarrant, 68, American bishop, heart attack.
Jack Tynan, 94, New Zealand Olympic field hockey player (1956), and cricketer (Wellington).
Kōzō Watanabe, 88, Japanese politician, member of the House of Representatives (1969–2012).

24
Stoyan Alexandrov, 71, Bulgarian economist, Minister of Finance (1992–1994).
Frederick Baker, 55, Austrian-British filmmaker and archaeologist.
Harold Best, 82, British politician, MP (1997–2005).
Pat Brady, 84, Irish footballer (Millwall).
László Cseh Sr., 68, Hungarian Olympic swimmer (1968, 1972).
Robbe De Hert, 77, English-born Belgian film director (De Witte van Sichem, Brylcream Boulevard, Lijmen/Het Been), complications from diabetes.
Sálvio Dino, 88, Brazilian writer and politician, Deputy (1963–1964, 1974–1979) and mayor of João Lisboa (1989–1993, 1997–2001), complications from COVID-19.
Chitta Ranjan Dutta, 93, Bangladeshi military officer, Director General of the Bangladesh Rifles (1971–1974).
Carl Garrett, 72, American football player (Chicago Bears, New York Jets, Oakland Raiders).
Avner Golasa, 63, Israeli footballer (Hapoel Kfar Saba).
Nancy Guptill, 79, Canadian politician, Prince Edward Island MLA (1987–2000).
Thomas Imrie, 83, British Hall of Fame ice hockey player (Paisley Pirates, Brighton Tigers, national team).
Touriya Jabrane, 67, Moroccan theatre director and politician, minister of culture (2007–2009), complications from COVID-19.
Arrigo Levi, 94, Italian journalist, managing director of La Stampa (1973–1978).
Kriemhild Limberg, 85, German Olympic discus thrower (1960, 1964).
Pascal Lissouba, 88, Congolese politician, President (1992–1997) and Prime Minister (1963–1966), complications from Alzheimer's disease. 
Jean Mauriac, 96, French writer and journalist.
Pat McCluskey, 68, Scottish footballer (Celtic, Dumbarton).
Hisamodien Mohamed, 55, South African politician and advocate, Member of the National Assembly of South Africa (2019–2020) and Western Cape head of the Department of Justice and Constitutional Development (1997–2019).
Mal Pascoe, 87, Australian football player (Essendon, Hobart) and coach.
Margot Prior, 82, Australian judge.
Jorge Sanjinez Lenz, 103, Peruvian military volunteer and World War II veteran (Independent Belgian Brigade).
Gail Sheehy, 83, American author (Hillary's Choice), complications from pneumonia.
Raymond S. Troubh, 94, American financial consultant.
Wolfgang Uhlmann, 85, German chess grandmaster, fall.
P. B. Waite, 98, Canadian historian.
Hartmut Wenzel, 73, German Olympic rower.
Paul Wolfisberg, 87, Swiss football player (Biel-Bienne) and manager (FC Luzern, national team).

25
Erik Allardt, 95, Finnish sociologist, Chancellor of Åbo Akademi University (1992–1994).
Francisco Belaúnde, 96, Peruvian politician, President of the Congress (1980–1981) and congressman (1980–1990).
Georges Bœuf, 82, French composer and musician.
Roine Carlsson, 82, Swedish politician, Minister of Defence 1985–1991.
Tommy Joe Coffey, 83, American-born Canadian football player (Edmonton Eskimos, Hamilton Tiger-Cats, Toronto Argonauts).
Pedro de Oraá, 88, Cuban painter.
Victor Ferkiss, 95, American historian.
Rebeca Guber, 94, Argentine mathematician and computer scientist.
Eric M. Hammel, 74, American military historian and novelist, Parkinson's disease.
Mick Hart, 50, Australian folk musician.
Ruhollah Hosseinian, 64, Iranian politician, member of the Council for Spreading Mahmoud Ahmadinejad's Thoughts (since 2007).
Mónica Jiménez, 79, Chilean politician, Minister of Education (2008–2010) and Ambassador to Israel (since 2016), cancer.
Yvon Le Corre, 80, French painter and navigator.
Laurent Akran Mandjo, 79, Ivorian Roman Catholic prelate, Bishop of Yopougon (1982–2015).
Gerry McGhee, 58, Scottish singer (Brighton Rock), cancer.
Sase Narain, 95, Guyanese politician, Speaker of the National Assembly (1971–1992).
Graham Newdick, 71, New Zealand cricketer (Wellington).
Itaru Oki, 79, Japanese jazz trumpeter and flugelhornist.
Sir David Parry-Evans, 85, British air chief marshal.
Tim Renton, Baron Renton of Mount Harry, 88, British politician, MP (1974–1997), Member of the House of Lords (1997–2016).
Neil Sachse, 69, Australian footballer and disability advocate.
Hippolyte Simon, 76, French Roman Catholic prelate, Archbishop of Clermont (2002–2016).
Nik Spatari, 91, Italian painter and sculptor.
Arnold Spielberg, 103, American electrical engineer (GE-200 series).
Alma G. Stallworth, 87, American politician, member of the Michigan House of Representatives (1971–1974, 1983–1996, 2003–2004).

26
Gerald Carr, 88, American astronaut (Skylab 4) and aeronautical engineer.
Oscar Cruz, 85, Filipino Roman Catholic prelate, Archbishop of Lingayen–Dagupan (1991–2009), president of the CBCP (1995–1999), complications from COVID-19.
Geraldine Dillon, 84, Australian television chef, Hodgkin lymphoma.
André-Paul Duchâteau, 95, Belgian novelist, scriptwriter and comics writer (Chick Bill, Ric Hochet).
Harry Elias, 83, Singaporean lawyer.
Max Evans, 95, American writer.
Adrien Gouteyron, 87, French politician.
Stuart Hailstone, 58, South African squash player, stroke.
Harry Hooper, 87, English footballer (West Ham United, Birmingham City, Sunderland), Alzheimer's disease.
Chizu Iiyama, 98, American civil rights activist and social worker.
Keri Kaa, 78, New Zealand educator and writer.
Masahiro Koishikawa, 68, Japanese astronomer, lung cancer.
José Lamiel, 96, Spanish painter and sculptor.
Douglas MacDiarmid, 97, New Zealand painter.
Masaru Maeta, 38, Japanese sumo wrestler, heart attack.
Victor Hugo Martínez Contreras, 90, Guatemalan Roman Catholic prelate, Archbishop of Los Altos Quetzaltenango-Totonicapán (1987–2007).
Dirk Mudge, 92, Namibian politician, COVID-19.
Martin O'Neill, Baron O'Neill of Clackmannan, 75, Scottish politician, MP (1979–2005) and member of the House of Lords (since 2005).
Gaston Roberge, 85, French-Canadian priest and film historian, cardiac arrest.
Jean Rosenthal, 97, French translator.
Ronald E. Rosser, 90, American soldier, Medal of Honor recipient.
Joe Ruby, 87, American animator and television producer (Scooby-Doo, Dynomutt, Dog Wonder, Alvin and the Chipmunks), co-founder of Ruby-Spears.
Stanford G. Ross, 88, American attorney, Commissioner of the Social Security Administration (1978–1979).
Bernard Sapoval, 82, French physicist.
Ørnulf Tofte, 98, Norwegian police officer (Police Surveillance Agency).
Els Veder-Smit, 98, Dutch politician, State Secretary for Health and Environment (1977–1981).
Jim Wood, 67, British Olympic biathlete.
Joyce Wright, 98, British singer and actress.
Dan Yochum, 70, American Hall of Fame football player (Montreal Alouettes, Edmonton Eskimos).

27
Siah Armajani, 81, Iranian-American sculptor and architect.
Bob Armstrong, 80, American Hall of Fame professional wrestler (GCW,  SECW, SMW), bone cancer.
Valerie Askew, 81, British modelling agent, heart failure.
Althea Braithwaite, 80, English author and illustrator.
David Bryant, 88, British lawn bowler, world champion (1966, 1980, 1988).
Pierluigi Camiscioni, 67, Italian rugby player and stuntman.
Lance Castles, 83, Australian scholar.
Cao Chunan, 90, Chinese electrochemist, member of the Chinese Academy of Sciences.
Gilda Cordero-Fernando, 90, Filipino writer and visual artist.
Claude De Bruyn, 76, Belgian serviceman and television presenter.
Sunil Dhar, 87, Bangladeshi classical musician, heart failure.
Robert Finkelstein, 104, American theoretical physicist.
Tony Fletcher, 85, Australian politician, Tasmanian MLC (1981–2005).
Jean-Michel Goutier, 85, French poet.
Margrét Þóra Hallgrímsson, 90, Icelandic businesswoman and socialite.
Noriyuki Haraguchi, 74, Japanese artist, stomach cancer.
William E. Harbour, 78, American civil rights activist (Freedom Riders).
Yves Hervochon, 85, French painter.
James E. Humphreys, 80, American mathematician, COVID-19.
Clarrie Jeffreys, 88, Australian rugby league player (Balmain, Newtown) and coach.
László Kamuti, 80, Hungarian Olympic fencer (1960, 1964, 1968, 1972).
Ivan Keats, 83, New Zealand Olympic long-distance runner (1964).
Don Kidd, 82, American politician, member of the New Mexico Senate (1993–2005), pancreatic cancer.
A. R. Lakshmanan, 78, Indian jurist, judge of the Supreme Court (2002–2007) and Chairman of the Law Commission (2006–2009), cardiac arrest.
Lee Wai Chun, Hong Kong comics artist. 
Archana Mahanta, 71, Indian folk singer, complications from a stroke.
Osamu Masuko, 71, Japanese business executive, heart failure.
Eugene McCabe, 90, Irish novelist and playwright.
David Mercer, 70, British sports commentator and tennis umpire.
William Neikirk, 82, American journalist and author, COVID-19 and dementia.
Lute Olson, 85, American Hall of Fame college basketball coach (Arizona Wildcats, Iowa Hawkeyes, Long Beach State 49ers).
Robert Manley Parker, 82, American jurist, Judge (1979–1994) and Chief Judge (1990–1994) of the E.D. Tex., Judge of the U.S. Court of Appeals for the Fifth Circuit (1994–2002).
Vejaynand Ramlakan, 62, South African military officer, Surgeon General of the South African Military Health Service (2005–2013), heart attack.
Dick Ritger, 81, American ten-pin bowler.
Arnaldo Saccomani, 71, Brazilian record producer and reality television judge (Ídolos, Qual é o Seu Talento?), complications from kidney failure and diabetes.
Melissa Shook, 81, American documentary photographer and artist, glioblastoma.
Martin Short, 76, British documentary producer and author, cancer.
Peter Sova, 75, Czech-born American cinematographer (Donnie Brasco, Good Morning, Vietnam, Lucky Number Slevin).
Barry Stuart, 86, Australian Olympic canoeist (1956, 1960, 1964, 1968).
Ebru Timtik, 42, Turkish human rights lawyer, suicide by fasting.
Ivar Ueland, 77, Norwegian politician.
Masud Yunus, 68, Indonesian politician, mayor of Mojokerto (2013–2018), COVID-19.

28
Gudrun Arenander, 99, Swedish Olympic discus thrower (1948) and handball player.
Don Bacon, 94, New Zealand microbiologist.
Chadwick Boseman, 43, American actor (Black Panther, 42, Marshall), Emmy winner (2022), complications from colon cancer.
David S. Cass Sr., 78, American film director (Avenging Angel, Desolation Canyon, Thicker than Water) and stuntman, complications from cancer.
Catherine D'Ovidio, 61, French bridge player.
Jean-Pierre Dickès, 78, French historian and doctor.
John P. Dobyns, 76, American politician, member of the Wisconsin State Assembly (1993–1999), liver disease.
Mike Joyce, 81, American golfer, complications from Parkinson's disease.
Randall Kenan, 57, American writer (A Visitation of Spirits).
Rahat Khan, 79, Bangladeshi journalist and novelist.
Shiro Kishibe, 71, Japanese actor (Monkey), heart failure. 
Jan Klenberg, 88, Finnish admiral, Chief of Defence (1990–1994).
Assar Lindbeck, 90, Swedish economist.
Art Plotnik, 82-83, American librarian and photographer.
Julia Evans Reed, 58, American author and journalist, cancer.
Seymour I. Schwartz, 92, American surgeon and writer (Schwartz's Principles of Surgery).
Antoinette Spaak, 92, Belgian politician, President of the Parliament of the French Community (1988–1992).
Wolfgang Stahl, 64, German spectroscopist.
Uli Stein, 73, German cartoonist.
Manuel Valdés, 89, Mexican comedian and actor (A Thousand and One Nights, Tom Thumb and Little Red Riding Hood, La leyenda de la Nahuala), cancer.
H. Vasanthakumar, 70, Indian politician, Tamil Nadu MLA (2016–2019) and MP (since 2019), COVID-19.
Lou Westende, 94, Australian politician, ACT MLA (1992–1994).

29
Vladimir Andreyev, 90, Russian actor (True Friends, The Tale of Tsar Saltan, The Circus Princess), People's Artist of the USSR (1985).
Tom Berryhill, 67, American politician, member of the California State Senate (2010–2018) and Assembly (2006–2010).
Fritz Chervet, 77, Swiss boxer, European flyweight champion (1972, 1973).
Ali Ghandour, 89, Lebanese-Jordanian civil aviation executive.
Satnam Khattra, 31, Indian fitness trainer and bodybuilder, heart attack.
James F. Leonard, 100, American diplomat, Ambassador to the United Nations (1977–1979).
David Mungoshi, 71, Zimbabwean writer.
S. I. Padmavati, 103, Burmese-born Indian cardiologist, COVID-19.
Ramdeo Rai, 77, Indian politician, Bihar MLA (1972–1985, since 2005).
Domingo Rivas, 87, Venezuelan Olympic racing cyclist (1956).
Clifford Robinson, 53, American basketball player (Portland Trail Blazers, Phoenix Suns) and reality television personality (Survivor: Cagayan), lymphoma.
Shafaullah Rokhri, Pakistani singer, cardiac arrest.
Jürgen Schadeberg, 89, German-born South African photographer, stroke.
Subzero, 31, Australian racehorse, Melbourne Cup winner (1992), euthanized.
Serjik Teymourian, 46, Armenian-Iranian footballer (Esteghlal, Mainz 05), traffic collision.
Viktor Tikhonov, 71, Ukrainian politician, Vice Prime Minister (2010–2011), pneumonia.
Daniel I.C. Wang, 84, American chemical engineer.

30
Rodolfo Abularach, 87, Guatemalan painter.
Virginia Bosler, 93, American actress and dancer (Oklahoma!, Brigadoon, Out of This World).
Ric Drasin, 76, American bodybuilder, professional wrestler (NWA Hollywood Wrestling), promoter and trainer.
Ángel Faus Belau, 84, Spanish journalist and academic (University of Navarra).
Ralph Ferguson, 90, Canadian politician, MP (1980–1984, 1988–1993), Minister of Agriculture (1984).
Lance Finch, 82, Canadian jurist.
Jacques Galipeau, 96, Canadian actor (The Pyx, Bingo, Black List).
Nikos Gelestathis, 90, Greek politician, Minister of Transport and Communications (1990–1992) and Public Order (1992–1993), MP (1981–2004).
Gordon William Hanson, 77, Canadian politician.
Marguerite Harl, 101, French literary scholar.
Keith Lampard, 74, American baseball player (Houston Astros).
Ann Lynn, 86, British actress (Flame in the Streets, Strongroom, A Shot in the Dark).
Cecilia Romo, 74, Mexican actress (Prófugas del destino, Como tú no hay 2), COVID-19.
Ingrid Stahmer, 77, German politician.  
John Thompson, 78, American Hall of Fame basketball player (Boston Celtics) and coach (Georgetown Hoyas), national champion (1984), NBA champion (1965, 1966).
Ricardo Valderrama Fernández, 75, Peruvian anthropologist and politician, Mayor of Cusco Province (since 2019), COVID-19.
Jean Vezin, 87, French historian.

31
Nina Bocharova, 95, Ukrainian gymnast, Olympic champion (1952).
Al Bodine, 92, American football player (Saskatchewan Roughriders).
Haldun Boysan, 62, Turkish actor (On Board, Robbery Alla Turca, The Jackal), heart attack.
Jerilyn Lee Brandelius, 72, American rock and roll tour director (Grateful Dead), photographer and author (The Grateful Dead Family Album), heart failure.
Fritz d'Orey, 82, Brazilian racing driver, cancer.
Jack Danzey, 81, Australian rugby league player (Newtown, Balmain, Cronulla-Sutherland) and referee.
P. R. Dubhashi, 90, Indian civil servant and social scientist.
John Felagha, 26, Nigerian footballer (Eupen).
Larry Hedrick, 79, American businessman, leukemia.
Barbara Judge, 73, American-British lawyer and businesswoman, pancreatic cancer.
Pascal Kané, 74, French film director and screenwriter.
Édouard Karemera, 69, Rwandan politician and convicted war criminal.
Hans A. Linde, 96, German-born American judge and legal scholar, Justice of the Oregon Supreme Court (1977–1990).
Pietro Mário, 81, Italian-born Brazilian actor (Memórias Póstumas), cardiac arrest.
Ronnie McNutt, 33, American veteran, suicide by gunshot.
Massoud Mehrabi, 66, Iranian journalist, writer and caricaturist; heart attack.
Jean Baptiste Mendy, 57, Senegalese-born French boxer, WBC (1996–1997) and WBA lightweight champion (1998–1999), pancreatic cancer.
Sydney Meshkov, 93, American theoretical physicist.
Pranab Mukherjee, 84, Indian politician, President (2012–2017), Minister of Defence (2004–2006) and MP (1969–2012), septic shock.
Pak Kyong-suk, 99, North Korean politician, Deputy (1962–1972).
Don Parkinson, 77–78, American politician, Speaker of the Guam Legislature (1995–1997).
Michael Redhead, 90, British philosopher of science.
Miloš Říha, 61, Czech ice hockey player (Dukla Jihlava, Vítkovice Ridera) and coach (national team).
David Rothman, 83, American professor of social medicine, cancer.
Tom Seaver, 75, American Hall of Fame baseball player (New York Mets, Cincinnati Reds, Chicago White Sox), complications from Lewy body dementia and COVID-19.
Norm Spencer, 62, Canadian voice actor (X-Men, Rescue Heroes, Silver Surfer).
Yvonne, Lady Cochrane, 98, Lebanese aristocrat (Sursock family), philanthropist and advocate of the arts, injuries sustained in the 2020 Beirut explosion.
Bent Vejlby, 96, Danish actor (Dronningens vagtmester, Flådens friske fyre).
Morris Wijesinghe, 78, Sri Lankan musician.
Rich Wolfe, 78, American sportswriter, throat cancer.
Gérard Worms, 84, French banker.
Megan Wraight, 58, New Zealand landscape architect, cancer.

References

2020-08
 08